The Monnett Monerai is a sailplane that was developed in the United States in the late 1970s for homebuilding. It is a conventional pod-and-boom design with a V-tail and a mid-mounted cantilever wing of constant chord.

The kit assembles in approximately 600 hours. It has bonded wing skins and incorporates 90° flaps for glide path control. The pod-and-boom fuselage consists of a welded steel tube truss encased in a fiberglass shell, with an aluminum tube for the tailboom. A spar fitting modification was released in 1983.

A powered version was designed as the Monerai P with an engine mounted on a pylon above the wings. A Sachs Rotary Engine was chosen for the prototype. A version with extended wing tips is also available (Monerai Max) which increases the span to 12 m (39 ft) and raises the glide ratio from 28:1 to more than 30:1.

Both the powered Monerai P and the unpowered Monerai S versions are identical structurally.

Variants
Monerai S
unpowered glider
Monerai P
powered glider equipped with the  Zenoah G-25 or the  KFM 107 engine.
Monerai Max
Monerai P version with extended wing tips

Aircraft on display
US Southwest Soaring Museum
 Serial Number 22 on display at the New England Air Museum, Bradley International Airport, Windsor Locks, CT
 S/N 323, Museum of Flying, Santa Monica Airport, CA

Specifications (Monerai S)

References

External links 

Monerai entry at aero-web.org

1970s United States sailplanes
Glider aircraft
Homebuilt aircraft
Monnett aircraft
Aircraft first flown in 1978
V-tail aircraft
Mid-wing aircraft